This is an alphabetically sorted list of medical syndromes.

starting with numbers.
13q deletion syndrome
17q21.31 microdeletion syndrome
1p36 deletion syndrome
1q21.1 deletion syndrome
1q21.1 duplication syndrome
22q11.2 distal deletion syndrome
22q11.2 duplication syndrome
22q13 deletion syndrome
2p15-16.1 microdeletion syndrome
2q37 deletion syndrome
3-M syndrome
3C syndrome
3q29 microdeletion syndrome
49,XXXXY
4D syndrome
8p23.1 duplication syndrome
9q34 deletion syndrome

A
Aagenaes syndrome
Aarskog–Scott syndrome
Aase syndrome
Abandoned child syndrome
ABCD syndrome
Abdallat–Davis–Farrage syndrome
Abderhalden–Kaufmann–Lignac syndrome
Abdominal compartment syndrome
abdominal wall pain syndrome
Ablepharon macrostomia syndrome
Abruzzo–Erickson syndrome
Achard syndrome
Achard–Thiers syndrome
Ackerman syndrome
Acorea, microphthalmia and cataract syndrome
Acrocallosal syndrome
Acropectoral syndrome
Acro–dermato–ungual–lacrimal–tooth syndrome
Activation syndrome
Acute aortic syndrome
Acute brain syndrome
Acute chest syndrome
Acute coronary syndrome
Acute HME syndrome
Acute interstitial pneumonitis
Acute motor axonal neuropathy
acute platelet activation syndrome
Acute radiation syndrome
Acute respiratory distress syndrome
Acute retroviral syndrome
Adams–Nance syndrome
Adams–Oliver syndrome
Adams–Stokes syndrome
Adducted thumb syndrome
Adie syndrome
Adiposogenital dystrophy
Adult-onset immunodeficiency syndrome
Advanced sleep phase disorder
Aerotoxic syndrome
Afferent loop syndrome
Aicardi syndrome
Aicardi–Goutières syndrome
AIDS dysmorphic syndrome
Al-Raqad syndrome
Alagille syndrome
Albinism–deafness syndrome
Alcohol withdrawal syndrome
Alezzandrini syndrome
Alice in Wonderland syndrome
Alien hand syndrome
Allan–Herndon–Dudley syndrome
Allopurinol hypersensitivity syndrome
Alopecia contractures dwarfism mental retardation syndrome
Alpha-thalassemia mental retardation syndrome
Alport syndrome
Alström syndrome
Alvarez' syndrome
Amennorrhea-galactorrhea syndrome
Amniotic band constriction
Amotivational syndrome
Amplified musculoskeletal pain syndromes
Andermann syndrome
Andersen–Tawil syndrome
Androgen insensitivity syndrome
Angelman syndrome
ANOTHER syndrome
Anterior cerebral artery syndrome
Anterior compartment syndrome
Anterior cutaneous nerve entrapment syndrome
Anterior interosseous syndrome
Anterior spinal artery syndrome
Anticonvulsant hypersensitivity syndrome
Antidepressant discontinuation syndrome
Antiphospholipid syndrome
Antisynthetase syndrome
Antley–Bixler syndrome
Anton–Babinski syndrome
Aortic arch syndrome
Aortocaval compression syndrome
Apert syndrome
Apparent mineralocorticoid excess syndrome
Arakawa's syndrome II
Ardalan–Shoja–Kiuru syndrome
AREDYLD syndrome
Aromatase excess syndrome
Arterial tortuosity syndrome
Arthrogryposis–renal dysfunction–cholestasis syndrome
Arts syndrome
Ascher's syndrome
Asherman's syndrome
Asperger syndrome
Asymmetric crying facies
Ataxia-pancytopenia syndrome
Ataxia-telangiectasia
Athletic heart syndrome
Athymhormic syndrome
ATR-16 syndrome
Atrophodermia vermiculata
Atypical hemolytic uremic syndrome
Austrian syndrome
Autoimmune disease
Autoimmune lymphoproliferative syndrome
Autoimmune polyendocrine syndrome type 1
Autoimmune polyendocrine syndrome type 2
Autoimmune polyendocrine syndrome type 3
Autoimmune polyendocrine syndrome
Autoinflammatory syndromes
Avellis syndrome
Axenfeld syndrome
Axial spondyloarthritis
Ayazi syndrome

B
Babinski–Nageotte syndrome
Baboon syndrome
Baggio–Yoshinari syndrome
Baller–Gerold syndrome
Bamforth–Lazarus syndrome
Bangstad syndrome
Bannayan–Riley–Ruvalcaba syndrome
Banti's syndrome
Barakat syndrome
Barakat-Perenthaler syndrome
Bardet–Biedl syndrome
Bare lymphocyte syndrome type II
Bare lymphocyte syndrome
Barlow's syndrome
Barraquer–Simons syndrome
Bart syndrome
Barth Syndrome
Bartter syndrome
Bart–Pumphrey syndrome
Bassen-Kornzweig syndrome
Battered person syndrome
Bazex–Dupré–Christol syndrome
Beare–Stevenson cutis gyrata syndrome
Beckwith–Wiedemann syndrome
Behcet's syndrome
Behr syndrome
Benedikt syndrome
Benign fasciculation syndrome
Benjamin syndrome
Benzodiazepine withdrawal syndrome
Berdon syndrome
Berk–Tabatznik syndrome
Bernard–Soulier syndrome
Berserk llama syndrome
Bhaskar–Jagannathan syndrome
Biemond syndrome
Bilious vomiting syndrome
Binder's syndrome
Bing–Neel syndrome
Birt–Hogg–Dubé syndrome
Björnstad syndrome
Bland-White-Garland syndrome
Blau syndrome
Blepharophimosis, ptosis, epicanthus inversus syndrome
Blind loop syndrome
Bloom syndrome
Blount's disease
Blue baby syndrome
Blue diaper syndrome
Blue rubber bleb nevus syndrome
Blue toe syndrome
Bobble-head doll syndrome
Body fat redistribution syndrome
Boehm syndrome
Boerhaave syndrome
Bogart–Bacall syndrome
Bohring–Opitz syndrome
Bonnet–Dechaume–Blanc syndrome
Bowen–Conradi syndrome
Brachycephalic airway obstructive syndrome
Brainstem stroke syndrome
Branchio-oculo-facial syndrome
Branchio-oto-renal syndrome
Bromism
Brown's syndrome
Brown-Séquard syndrome
Brown–Vialetto–Van Laere syndrome
Bruck syndrome
Brugada syndrome
Brunner syndrome
Budd–Chiari syndrome
Burning feet syndrome
Burning mouth syndrome
Burnside–Butler syndrome
Buschke–Ollendorff syndrome
Bálint's syndrome
Börjeson-Forssman-Lehmann syndrome

C
CADASIL
Camera-Marugo-Cohen syndrome
CAMFAK syndrome
Camptodactyly-arthropathy-coxa vara-pericarditis syndrome
Cancer syndrome
Cancer-related fatigue
CANDLE syndrome
Canine epileptoid cramping syndrome
Cannabinoid hyperemesis syndrome (CHS)
Cantú syndrome
Capgras delusion
Capgras syndrome
Capillary leak syndrome
Caplan's syndrome
Carcinoid syndrome
Cardiac syndrome X
Cardiofaciocutaneous syndrome
Cardiorenal syndrome
Cardiovascular syndrome
Carney complex
Caroli disease
Carpal tunnel syndrome
Carpenter syndrome
Cat eye syndrome
Cataract-microcornea syndrome
Catastrophic antiphospholipid syndrome
Catel–Manzke syndrome
Cauda equina syndrome
Caudal regression syndrome
CDK13-related disorder
Celebrity worship syndrome
Central centrifugal cicatricial alopecia
Central cord syndrome
Central nervous system syndrome
Central pain syndrome
Cerebellar cognitive affective syndrome
Cerebellar stroke syndrome
Cerebellopontine angle syndrome
Cerebral salt-wasting syndrome
cervical disc syndrome
Cervical syndrome
Cervicocranial syndrome
Charcot–Marie–Tooth disease
CHARGE syndrome
Charles Bonnet syndrome
Chiari–Frommel syndrome
Chiasmal syndrome
Chilaiditi syndrome
Child sexual abuse accommodation syndrome
CHILD syndrome
childhood myelodysplastic syndrome
Childhood tumor syndrome
Chinese Restaurant Syndrome
Chromosomal deletion syndrome
Chromosome 5q deletion syndrome
Chronic fatigue syndrome
Chronic functional abdominal pain
Chronic infantile neurologic cutaneous and articular syndrome
Chronic Lyme disease
Chronic prostatitis/chronic pelvic pain syndrome
Churg–Strauss syndrome
Chédiak–Higashi syndrome
Claude's syndrome
Clinically isolated syndrome
CLOVES syndrome
COACH syndrome
Cobb syndrome
Cockayne syndrome
Coffin–Lowry syndrome
Coffin–Siris syndrome
Cogan syndrome
Cohen syndrome
Compartment syndrome
Complement deficiency
Complete androgen insensitivity syndrome
Complex regional pain syndrome
Computer vision syndrome
Congenital bilateral perisylvian syndrome
Congenital generalized lipodystrophy
Congenital insensitivity to pain
Congenital myasthenic syndrome
Congenital nephrotic syndrome
Congenital rubella syndrome
Conn's syndrome
Conorenal syndrome
Conradi–Hünermann syndrome
Constriction ring syndrome
Contiguous gene syndrome
Conus medullaris syndrome
Cooks syndrome
Cord colitis syndrome
Corneal-cerebellar syndrome
Corneal dystrophy-perceptive deafness syndrome
Cornelia de Lange Syndrome
Corneodermatoosseous syndrome
Coronary steal
Costeff syndrome
Costello syndrome
Cotard delusion
Cotard's Syndrome
Cotton fever
Cowden syndrome
Cracked tooth syndrome
Cramp fasciculation syndrome
Crandall syndrome
Craniosynostosis–anal anomalies–porokeratosis syndrome
Cranio-lenticulo-sutural dysplasia
CREST syndrome
Cri du chat
Crigler–Najjar syndrome
Crome syndrome
Cronkhite–Canada syndrome
Cross syndrome
Crouzon syndrome
Crouzonodermoskeletal syndrome
Crush syndrome
Cruveilhier-Baumgarten syndrome
Cryopyrin-associated periodic syndrome
Cuboid syndrome
Currarino syndrome
CuRRL syndrome
Cushing's syndrome
Cyclic vomiting syndrome
Cytokine release syndrome

D
Da Costa's syndrome
Daentl Townsend Siegel syndrome
Dahlberg Borer Newcomer syndrome
Dandy–Walker syndrome
De Barsy syndrome
de Clérambault's syndrome
De Quervain syndrome
Dead arm syndrome
Deficiency of the interleukin-1–receptor antagonist
Degenerative disc disease
Dejerine–Roussy syndrome
Delayed sleep phase disorder
Delusional misidentification syndrome
Delusional parasitosis
Dennie–Marfan syndrome
Dentomandibular sensorimotor dysfunction
Denys–Drash syndrome
DeSanctis–Cacchione syndrome
Descending perineum syndrome
Diabetic stiff hand syndrome
Dialysis disequilibrium syndrome
Diencephalic syndrome
Diffuse infiltrative lymphocytosis syndrome
DiGeorge syndrome
Diogenes syndrome
Diploid triploid mosaic
Disconnection syndrome
Distal 18q-
Distal intestinal obstruction syndrome
Distal trisomy 10q
Doege–Potter syndrome
Donnai–Barrow syndrome
Donohue syndrome
DOOR syndrome
Dopamine dysregulation syndrome
Down syndrome
Dravet syndrome
Dressler syndrome
Drug reaction with eosinophilia and systemic symptoms
Dry eye syndrome
Duane syndrome
Duane-radial ray syndrome
Dubin–Johnson syndrome
Dubowitz syndrome
Dumping syndrome
dysarthria-clumsy hand syndrome
Dysexecutive syndrome
Dyskeratosis congenita
Dysplastic nevus syndrome

E
Eagle syndrome
EAST syndrome
Ectrodactyly–ectodermal dysplasia–cleft syndrome
Edwards syndrome
EEM syndrome
Egg drop syndrome
Ehlers–Danlos syndrome
Eiken syndrome
Einstein syndrome
Eisenmenger's syndrome
Eldomery-Sutton syndrome
Elejalde syndrome
Ellis–van Creveld syndrome
Emanuel syndrome
Empty nest syndrome
Empty nose syndrome
Empty sella syndrome
Enlarged vestibular aqueduct syndrome
Environmental dependency syndrome
Eosinophilia–myalgia syndrome
Eosinophilic cellulitis
Epidermal nevus syndrome
Epilepsy syndromes
Episodic dyscontrol syndrome
Epizootic ulcerative syndrome
Erdheim–Chester disease
Erondu–Cymet syndrome
Estrogen insensitivity syndrome
Euthyroid sick syndrome
Evans syndrome
Excess ovarian androgen release syndrome
Exploding head syndrome
Extrapyramidal symptoms

F
FACES syndrome
Facet syndrome
Facial Onset Sensory Motor Neuropathy syndrome
Fahr's syndrome
Failed back syndrome
familial cholestasis syndrome
Familial cold autoinflammatory syndrome
Familial Mediterranean fever
Familial partial lipodystrophy
Fanconi syndrome
Favre–Racouchot syndrome
Febrile infection-related epilepsy syndrome
Febrile neutrophilic dermatosis
Fechtner syndrome
Feingold syndrome
Feline hyperesthesia syndrome
Felty's syndrome
Femur fibula ulna syndrome
Fetal alcohol syndrome
Fetal hydantoin syndrome
Fetal trimethadione syndrome
Fetal warfarin syndrome
FG syndrome
Fibrinolysis syndrome
Fibromyalgia syndrome
Fibromyalgia
First arch syndrome
Fish acute toxicity syndrome
Fitz-Hugh–Curtis syndrome
Fitzsimmons–Guilbert syndrome
Flammer syndrome
Fleischer's syndrome
Floating–Harbor syndrome
Floppy eyelid syndrome
Floppy trunk syndrome
Florid cutaneous papillomatosis
Flynn–Aird syndrome
Foal immunodeficiency syndrome
Foerster's syndrome
Foix–Alajouanine syndrome
Foix–Chavany–Marie syndrome
Folie à deux
Follicle-stimulating hormone insensitivity
foramen magnum compression syndrome
Forbes-Albright syndrome
Foreign accent syndrome
Foster–Kennedy syndrome
Fountain syndrome
Foville's syndrome
Fragile X syndrome
Fragile X-associated tremor/ataxia syndrome
Franceschetti–Klein syndrome
Frank–ter Haar syndrome
Fraser syndrome
Frasier syndrome
Freeman–Sheldon syndrome
Frey's syndrome
Froin's syndrome
Fryns syndrome
Functional somatic syndrome

G
Gaisböck syndrome
Galloway Mowat syndrome
GAPO syndrome
Gardner's syndrome
Gastric outlet obstruction
Gastrocutaneous syndrome
Gastrointestinal syndrome
Genitopatellar syndrome
Gerstmann syndrome
Gerstmann–Sträussler–Scheinker syndrome
Geschwind syndrome
Gianotti–Crosti syndrome
Giant platelet disorder
Guillain-Barre syndrome
Gillespie syndrome
Gitelman syndrome
Gleich's syndrome
GMS syndrome
Goldberg–Shprintzen syndrome
Goldenhar syndrome
Gomez and López-Hernández syndrome
Gonadotropin insensitivity
Gonadotropin-releasing hormone insensitivity
Goodpasture syndrome
Gordon syndrome
Gougerot–Blum syndrome
Gourmand syndrome
Gouverneurs syndrome
GRACILE syndrome
Graham-Little syndrome
Gray baby syndrome
Gray platelet syndrome
Grayson-Wilbrandt corneal dystrophy
Greater trochanteric pain syndrome
Green nail syndrome
Greig cephalopolysyndactyly syndrome
Grinspan's syndrome
Griscelli syndrome type 2
Griscelli syndrome type 3
Griscelli syndrome
Grisel's syndrome
Growing teratoma syndrome
Grunya's Syndrome
Gilbert's syndrome
Gulf War syndrome
Gullo syndrome

H
Haber syndrome
Hagemoser–Weinstein–Bresnick syndrome
Haglund's syndrome
Haim–Munk syndrome
Hajdu–Cheney syndrome
Halal syndrome
Hallermann–Streiff syndrome
Hamman's syndrome
Hamman-Rich syndrome
Hand-foot-genital syndrome
Handigodu syndrome
Hanhart syndrome
Hantavirus pulmonary syndrome
Hapnes Boman Skeie syndrome
Harlequin syndrome
Harris platelet syndrome
Harrison syndrome
Havana syndrome
Hay–Wells syndrome
Hearing loss with craniofacial syndromes
HEC syndrome
Heel pad syndrome
Heel spur syndrome
Heerfordt syndrome
HELLP syndrome
Hemihyperplasia–multiple lipomatosis syndrome
Hemimegalencephaly
Hemispatial neglect
Hemoglobin Lepore syndrome
Hemolytic-uremic syndrome
Hennekam syndrome
Hepatopulmonary syndrome
Hepatorenal syndrome
Hereditary breast–ovarian cancer syndrome
Hereditary hyperbilirubinemia
Hereditary leiomyomatosis and renal cell cancer syndrome
Hereditary neuralgic amyotrophy
Hereditary nonpolyposis colorectal cancer
Hermansky–Pudlak syndrome
Hero syndrome
Heyde's syndrome
High-rise syndrome
 (Lazy bladder syndrome)
HIV/AIDS
Holiday heart syndrome
Holt–Oram syndrome
Hopkins syndrome
Horn-Kolb syndrome
Horner's syndrome
Howel–Evans syndrome
Hoyeraal-Hreidarsson syndrome
Ho–Kaufman–Mcalister syndrome
Hughes–Stovin syndrome
Hunan hand syndrome
Hunter syndrome
Huntington's disease-like syndrome
HUPRA syndrome
Hurler syndrome
Hurler–Scheie syndrome
Hutchinson–Gilford progeria syndrome
Hydrolethalus syndrome
Hyper IgM syndrome
Hyper-IgD syndrome
Hyper-IgM syndrome type 1
Hyper-IgM syndrome type 2
Hyper-IgM syndrome type 3
Hyper-IgM syndrome type 4
Hyper-IgM syndrome type 5
Hyperimmunoglobulin D syndrome
Hyperimmunoglobulin E syndrome
Hyperleukocytosis syndrome
Hypermobility syndrome
Hyperosmolar syndrome
Hyperprolactinaemia
Hyperprolactinemic SAHA syndrome
Hypertension and brachydactyly syndrome
Hypertrichosis cubiti
Hyperventilation syndrome
Hyperviscosity syndrome
Hypohidrotic ectodermal dysplasia
Hypoplastic left heart syndrome
Hypoplastic right heart syndrome
Hypotonia
Hypotrichosis–acro-osteolysis–onychogryphosis–palmoplantar keratoderma–periodontitis syndrome
Hypotrichosis–lymphedema–telangiectasia syndrome
Hystrix-like ichthyosis–deafness syndrome

I
Ichthyosis follicularis with alopecia and photophobia syndrome
Ichthyosis prematurity syndrome
Idiopathic pneumonia syndrome
Idiopathic postprandial syndrome
Idiopathic pure sudomotor failure
Iliotibial band syndrome
Imerslund–Gräsbeck syndrome
Immersion foot syndromes
Immune reconstitution inflammatory syndrome
Immunodeficiency–centromeric instability–facial anomalies syndrome
Impingement syndrome
Imposter syndrome
Incontinentia pigmenti
Infant respiratory distress syndrome
Inferior vena cava syndrome
Infertility in polycystic ovary syndrome
Influenza-like illness
Institutional syndrome
Intersection syndrome
Interstitial cystitis
Intracranial hypertension syndrome
Intraoperative floppy iris syndrome
Intravenous marijuana syndrome
IPEX syndrome
Iridocorneal endothelial syndrome
Irlen syndrome
Irregular sleep–wake rhythm
irritable bladder syndrome
Irritable bowel syndrome
Irritable male syndrome
Irukandji syndrome
Irvine–Gass syndrome
Isolated brainstem syndrome

J
Jackson–Weiss syndrome
Jacobsen syndrome
Jaffe–Campanacci syndrome
Jalili syndrome
Jansen's metaphyseal chondrodysplasia
Janz syndrome
Jeavons syndrome
Jervell and Lange-Nielsen syndrome
Johanson–Blizzard syndrome
Johnson–McMillin syndrome
Johnson–Munson syndrome
Joubert syndrome
Juberg-Hellman syndrome
Jugular foramen syndrome
Juvenile polyposis syndrome
Jerusalem syndrome

K
Kabuki syndrome
Kallmann syndrome
Kapur–Toriello syndrome
Karak syndrome
Karsch-Neugebauer syndrome
Kartagener's syndrome
Kasabach–Merritt syndrome
Katz syndrome
Kaufman oculocerebrofacial syndrome
Kearns–Sayre syndrome
Keppen–Lubinsky syndrome
Keratitis–ichthyosis–deafness syndrome
Keratosis linearis with ichthyosis congenita and sclerosing keratoderma syndrome
Keutel syndrome
Kimmelstiel-Wilson syndrome
Kindler syndrome
King–Kopetzky syndrome
Kleine–Levin syndrome
Klinefelter syndrome
Klippel–Feil syndrome
Klippel–Trénaunay syndrome
Klüver–Bucy syndrome
Knobloch syndrome
Kocher–Debre–Semelaigne syndrome
Kohlschütter-Tönz syndrome
Korsakoff's syndrome
Kostmann syndrome
Kounis syndrome
Kowarski syndrome
Kufor–Rakeb syndrome
König's syndrome

L
Lachiewicz–Sibley syndrome
Lacunar Stroke Syndrome
Lambert–Eaton myasthenic syndrome
Landau–Kleffner syndrome
Langer–Giedion syndrome
Laron syndrome
Larsen syndrome
Laryngoonychocutaneous syndrome
Lateral medullary syndrome
Lateral meningocele syndrome
Lateral pontine syndrome
Laugier–Hunziker syndrome
Laurence–Moon syndrome
Lavender foal syndrome
Lavender Town
Lawrence–Seip syndrome
Lazarus syndrome
Leaky gut syndrome
Legg–Calvé–Perthes disease
Legius syndrome
Leiner's disease
Lelis syndrome
Lemierre's syndrome
Lennox–Gastaut syndrome
Lenz microphthalmia syndrome
Lenz–Majewski syndrome
Leriche's syndrome
Leschke syndrome
Lesch–Nyhan syndrome
Lethal congenital contracture syndrome
Lethal white syndrome
Leukotriene receptor antagonist-associated Churg–Strauss syndrome
Levator ani syndrome
Leydig cell hypoplasia
Liddle's syndrome
Liebenberg syndrome
LIG4 syndrome
Lima syndrome
Limb girdle syndrome
Limber tail syndrome
Limb–mammary syndrome
Linburg–Comstock syndrome
Li–Fraumeni syndrome
Locked-in syndrome
Locomotive syndrome
Loeys–Dietz syndrome
Loin pain hematuria syndrome
Long face syndrome
Long QT syndrome
Loose anagen syndrome
Lown–Ganong–Levine syndrome
Lowry–MacLean syndrome
Lucey–Driscoll syndrome
Lujan–Fryns syndrome
lumbar disc syndrome
Lupus-like syndrome
Lutembacher's syndrome
Lymphangitis carcinomatosa
Lymphedema–distichiasis syndrome
Lynch syndrome
Lyngstadaas syndrome
Löffler's syndrome
Löfgren syndrome

M
M74 syndrome
Macrocephaly-capillary malformation
Macrophage activation syndrome
Maffucci syndrome
Majeed syndrome
Majewski's polydactyly syndrome
Mal de debarquement
Malformative syndrome
Mallory–Weiss syndrome
Malnutrition–inflammation complex
Malouf syndrome
Malpuech facial clefting syndrome
Management of chronic headaches
Manning criteria
Marchiafava–Bignami disease
Marden–Walker syndrome
Mare reproductive loss syndrome
Marfan syndrome
Marfanoid–progeroid–lipodystrophy syndrome
Marie Antoinette syndrome
Marinesco–Sjögren syndrome
Maroteaux–Lamy syndrome
Marshall syndrome
Marshall–Smith syndrome
Marshall–White syndrome
MASA syndrome
Mast cell activation syndrome
Mauriac syndrome
Mayer–Rokitansky–Küster–Hauser syndrome
May–Thurner syndrome
May–White syndrome
McArdle syndrome
McCune–Albright syndrome
McCusick syndrome
McGillivray syndrome
McKittrick–Wheelock syndrome
McKusick–Kaufman syndrome
McLeod syndrome
MDP syndrome
Mean world syndrome
Meckel syndrome
Meconium aspiration syndrome
Medial medullary syndrome
Medial pontine syndrome
Median arcuate ligament syndrome
Medical students' disease
MEDNIK syndrome
Megavitamin-B6 syndrome
Meige's syndrome
Meigs' syndrome
MELAS syndrome
Melkersson–Rosenthal syndrome
Melnick–Needles syndrome
Memory distrust syndrome
Mendelson's syndrome
Menkes disease
MERRF syndrome
Metabolic syndrome
Michelin tire baby syndrome
Michels Caskey syndrome
Michels syndrome
Mickleson syndrome
Micro syndrome
Microdeletion syndrome
Microphthalmia–dermal aplasia–sclerocornea syndrome
Middle cerebral artery syndrome
Middle child syndrome
Middle East respiratory syndrome
Mikulicz syndrome
Mild androgen insensitivity syndrome
Milk-alkali syndrome
Millard–Gubler syndrome
Miller Fisher syndrome
Miller syndrome
Miller–Dieker syndrome
Milroy's disease
Milwaukee shoulder syndrome
Mirhosseini–Holmes–Walton syndrome
Mirizzi's syndrome
Mirror syndrome
Mismatch repair cancer syndrome
Mitochondrial DNA depletion syndrome
Mitochondrial neurogastrointestinal encephalopathy syndrome
Mitral valve prolapse
Mittelschmerz
Mohr–Tranebjærg syndrome
MOMO syndrome
Monofixation syndrome
MonoMAC
mononucleosis like syndrome
Morgagni Stewart Morel syndrome
MORM syndrome
Morquio syndrome
Morvan's syndrome
Mouth and genital ulcers with inflamed cartilage syndrome
Mowat–Wilson syndrome
Moyamoya disease
Moynahan syndrome
Muckle–Wells syndrome
Muenke syndrome
Muir–Torre syndrome
Mukamel syndrome
Multiple endocrine neoplasia type 1
Multiple endocrine neoplasia type 2
Multiple evanescent white dot syndrome
Multiple hamartoma syndrome
Multiple organ dysfunction syndrome
Multiple pterygium syndrome
Munchausen syndrome
Mungan syndrome
Musical ear syndrome
Mycosis fungoides
Myelodysplastic syndrome
Myoclonic astatic epilepsy
Myofascial pain syndrome
Myomatous erythrocytosis syndrome
Möbius syndrome
Müllerian agenesis

N
Nablus mask-like facial syndrome
Naegeli–Franceschetti–Jadassohn syndrome
Nager acrofacial dysostosis
Nail–patella syndrome
Nakajo syndrome
Nance–Horan syndrome
Napoleonist Syndrome
Nasodigitoacoustic syndrome
Naxos syndrome
Nelson's syndrome
NEMO deficiency syndrome
Neonatal ichthyosis–sclerosing cholangitis syndrome
Nephritic syndrome
Nephrotic syndrome
Nerve compression syndrome
Netherton syndrome
Neu–Laxova syndrome
Neuro-cardio-facial-cutaneous syndromes
Neurofibromatosis type I
Neuroleptic malignant syndrome
Neuroleptic-Induced Deficit Syndrome
Neutrophil immunodeficiency syndrome
Nevo syndrome
Nevoid basal-cell carcinoma syndrome
Nezelof syndrome
Nicolaides–Baraitser syndrome
Nicolau–Balus syndrome
Night eating syndrome
Nijmegen breakage syndrome
Njølstad syndrome
Nodding disease
Non-24-hour sleep–wake disorder
Noonan syndrome with multiple lentigines
Noonan syndrome
Norman–Roberts syndrome
Northern epilepsy syndrome
Nutcracker syndrome

O
Occipital horn syndrome
Ocular ischemic syndrome
Oculo-respiratory syndrome
Oculoauricular syndrome
Oculocerebrocutaneous syndrome
Oculocerebrorenal syndrome
Oculofaciocardiodental syndrome
Oculomucocutaneous syndrome
Odontoma dysphagia syndrome
Odonto–tricho–ungual–digital–palmar syndrome
Ogden Syndrome
Ogilvie syndrome
Ohtahara syndrome
Olfactory reference syndrome
Oliver–McFarlane syndrome
Omenn syndrome
One and a half syndrome
Oneiroid syndrome
Opitz G/BBB Syndrome
Opsoclonus myoclonus syndrome
Oral allergy syndrome
Oral mite anaphylaxis
Oral-facial-digital syndrome
Orbital apex syndrome
Organic brain syndrome
Organic dust toxic syndrome
Orofaciodigital syndrome 1
Ortner's syndrome
Os trigonum syndrome
OSLAM syndrome
Osler–Weber–Rendu disease
Otodental syndrome
Otofacial syndrome
Ovarian hyperstimulation syndrome
Ovarian vein syndrome
Overgrowth syndrome
Overlap syndrome

P
Pacak–Zhuang syndrome
Pacemaker syndrome
Painful bruising syndrome
Pallister–Hall syndrome
Pallister–Killian syndrome
Panayiotopoulos syndrome
Pancoast tumor
Pantothenate kinase-associated neurodegeneration
PAPA syndrome
Papillon–Lefèvre syndrome
Papillorenal syndrome
Papular purpuric gloves and socks syndrome
Paraneoplastic acrokeratosis
Paraneoplastic cerebellar degeneration
Paraneoplastic syndrome
Parental alienation syndrome
Parinaud's oculoglandular syndrome
Parinaud's syndrome
Paris-Trousseau syndrome
Parkes Weber syndrome
Parkinson plus syndrome
Paroxysmal hand hematoma
Paroxysmal tachycardia
Parry–Romberg syndrome
Parsonage–Turner syndrome
Partial androgen insensitivity syndrome
Pashayan syndrome
Patau syndrome
Patellar subluxation syndrome
Patellofemoral pain syndrome
Patterson syndrome
Pearson syndrome
PANDAS
Peeling skin syndrome
PEHO syndrome
Pellegrini–Stieda syndrome
Pelvic congestion syndrome
Pelvic pain
Pemphigus erythematosus
Pendred syndrome
Penile Artery Shunt Syndrome
Pentalogy of Cantrell
Periodic fever syndrome
Periodic fever, aphthous stomatitis, pharyngitis and adenitis
Perisylvian syndrome
Perlman syndrome
Persistent adrenarche syndrome
Persistent genital arousal disorder
Persistent Müllerian duct syndrome
Pervasive refusal syndrome
Peters-plus syndrome
Peutz–Jeghers syndrome
Pfeiffer syndrome
Phantom eye syndrome
Phantom limb
Phantom vibration syndrome
Pickwickian syndrome
Pigment dispersion syndrome
Pigmented hairy epidermal nevus syndrome
Pilotto syndrome
Piriformis syndrome
Pitt–Hopkins syndrome
Plica syndrome
Plummer–Vinson syndrome
POEMS syndrome
Poland syndrome
Polar T3 syndrome
Polio-like syndrome
Polycystic ovary syndrome
Popliteal artery entrapment syndrome
Popliteal pterygium syndrome
Porcine stress syndrome
Pork–cat syndrome
Post micturition convulsion syndrome
Post nasal drip syndrome
Post traumatic stress syndrome
Post-acute-withdrawal syndrome
Post-concussion syndrome
Post-Ebola virus syndrome
post-embolization syndrome
Post-intensive care syndrome
Post-maturity syndrome
Post-polio syndrome
Post-thrombotic syndrome
Post-vasectomy pain syndrome
Postcardiotomy syndrome
Postcholecystectomy syndrome
Posterior cerebral artery syndrome
Posterior cord syndrome
Posterior rami syndrome
Posterior reversible encephalopathy syndrome
Postgastrectomy syndromes
Postorgasmic illness syndrome
Postperfusion syndrome
Postpericardiotomy syndrome
Postural orthostatic tachycardia syndrome
Potocki–Lupski syndrome
Potocki–Shaffer syndrome
Potter sequence
Prader–Willi syndrome
Pre-excitation syndrome
Precordial catch syndrome
Premenstrual syndrome
Presumed ocular histoplasmosis syndrome
Pretzel syndrome
Primary pigmented nodular adrenocortical disease
Primrose syndrome
Progeroid syndromes
Progressive supranuclear palsy
Pronator teres syndrome
Propofol infusion syndrome
Proteus syndrome
Proteus-like syndrome
Prune belly syndrome
Pseudo-Cushing's syndrome
Pseudodementia
Pseudoexfoliation syndrome
Psychoorganic syndrome
Puer aeternus
Pulmonary leukostasis syndrome
Pulmonary-renal syndrome
Purple glove syndrome
Purple urine bag syndrome

Q
Qazi–Markouizos syndrome
Quadrilateral space syndrome
Queen bee syndrome

R
Rabbit syndrome
Rabson–Mendenhall syndrome
Radial tunnel syndrome
Rage syndrome
Raghib syndrome
Raine syndrome
Ramos-Arroyo syndrome
Ramsay Hunt syndrome type 1
Ramsay Hunt syndrome type 2
Ramsay Hunt syndrome
RAPADILINO syndrome
Rape trauma syndrome
Rapp–Hodgkin syndrome
Rapunzel syndrome
Rasmussen syndrome
RASopathy
Raymond Céstan syndrome
Raynaud syndrome
Red ear syndrome
Red man syndrome (Drug eruption)
Refeeding syndrome
Reactive arthritis
Renal dysplasia-limb defects syndrome
Renfield syndrome
Renpenning's syndrome
Restless legs syndrome
Restrictive dermopathy
Retinoic acid syndrome
Retirement syndrome
Rett syndrome
Reversible cerebral vasoconstriction syndrome
Revesz syndrome
Reye syndrome
Reynolds syndrome
Reynolds' pentad
Rh deficiency syndrome
Riddoch syndrome
Right middle lobe syndrome
Riley-Day Syndrome
Riley–Day syndrome
Ring chromosome 14 syndrome
Ring chromosome 20 syndrome
Roberts syndrome
Robinow syndrome
Rochon-Duvigneaud's syndrome
Roemheld syndrome
ROHHAD
Romano–Ward syndrome
Rombo syndrome
Rosenthal syndrome
Rosenthal–Kloepfer syndrome
Ross' syndrome
Rosselli–Gulienetti syndrome
Rothmund–Thomson syndrome
Rotor syndrome
Roussy–Lévy syndrome
Rubinstein–Taybi syndrome
Rud syndrome
Rudiger syndrome
Rumination syndrome
Runting-stunting syndrome in broilers
RUQ syndrome
Ruzicka Goerz Anton syndrome

S
Saal Bulas syndrome
Saal Greenstein syndrome
Sabinas brittle hair syndrome
Sack–Barabas syndrome
SACRAL syndrome
Saethre–Chotzen syndrome
SAHA syndrome
Sakati–Nyhan–Tisdale syndrome
Salt water aspiration syndrome
Sandifer syndrome
Sanfilippo syndrome
Sanjad-Sakati syndrome
SAPHO syndrome
Satoyoshi syndrome
Savant syndrome
Say syndrome
Say–Meyer syndrome
Scalp–ear–nipple syndrome
SCARF syndrome
Scheie syndrome
Schimmelpenning syndrome
Schinzel–Giedion syndrome
Schmitt Gillenwater Kelly syndrome
Schnitzler syndrome
Schwartz–Jampel syndrome
Schöpf–Schulz–Passarge syndrome
Scimitar syndrome
Scott syndrome
Seaver Cassidy syndrome
Seckel syndrome
Second-impact syndrome
Secretan's syndrome
Seed dispersal syndrome
Senior–Løken syndrome
Sensenbrenner syndrome
Septo-optic dysplasia
Serkal syndrome
Serotonin syndrome
Serpentine fibula-polycystic kidney syndrome
Sertoli cell-only syndrome
Serum sickness–like reaction
Setleis syndrome
Severe acute respiratory syndrome
Shaken baby syndrome
Shapiro syndrome
Sheehan's syndrome
Shell nail syndrome
Shone's syndrome
Short anagen syndrome
Short bowel syndrome
short limb syndrome
Short man syndrome
Short QT syndrome
Short rib – polydactyly syndrome
SHORT syndrome
Shoulder hand syndrome (frozen shoulder)
Shwachman–Diamond syndrome
Shy-Drager syndrome
Shy-Drager syndrome
Sick building syndrome
Sick sinus syndrome
Silver–Russell syndrome
Simpson–Golabi–Behmel syndrome
Singleton Merten syndrome
Situs ambiguus
Sjögren's syndrome
Sjögren–Larsson syndrome
Skeeter syndrome
Skin fragility syndrome
Sliding uncus syndrome
Slit ventricle syndrome
Sly syndrome
Small intestinal bacterial overgrowth
Small Penis Syndrome
Smith Martin Dodd syndrome
Smith–Fineman–Myers syndrome
Smith–Lemli–Opitz syndrome
Smith–Magenis syndrome
Snapping hip syndrome
Snapping scapula syndrome
Sneddon's syndrome
Solipsism syndrome
somatostatinoma syndrome
Sopite syndrome
Sotos syndrome
Space adaptation syndrome
Spastic ataxia-corneal dystrophy syndrome
Spider lamb syndrome
Splenic flexure syndrome
Split hand syndrome
Spondylo-ocular syndrome
SPRED1
Staphylococcal scalded skin syndrome
STAR syndrome
Stauffer syndrome
Stendhal syndrome
Steroid dementia syndrome
Stevens–Johnson syndrome
Stewart–Treves syndrome
Stickler syndrome
Sticky platelet syndrome
Sticky skin syndrome
Stiff person syndrome
Stiff skin syndrome
Stimmler syndrome
Stockholm syndrome
Straight back syndrome
Stratton Parker syndrome
Streff syndrome
Strømme syndrome
Stuck song syndrome
Student syndrome
Sturge–Weber syndrome
Subclavian steal syndrome
Sudden death syndrome
Sudden infant death syndrome
Sudden wealth syndrome
Sugarman syndrome
Sulfonamide hypersensitivity syndrome
Summer penile syndrome
Sundowning
Superior mesenteric artery syndrome
Superior orbital fissure syndrome
Superior vena cava syndrome
Supernumerary nipples–uropathies–Becker's nevus syndrome
Supernumerary phantom limb
Survivor syndrome
Susac's syndrome
Sweet's syndrome
Swyer–James syndrome
Syndrome of inappropriate antidiuretic hormone secretion
Syndrome of subjective doubles
Syndrome Without A Name
HHH syndrome
Systemic inflammatory response syndrome
Sézary disease

T
Talk and die syndrome
TAN syndrome
TAR syndrome
Tardive dyskinesia
Tardive psychosis
Tardive syndrome
Tarsal tunnel syndrome
Taura syndrome
Taussig–Bing syndrome
Tea and toast syndrome
TEMPI syndrome
Temple–Baraitser syndrome
Tension myositis syndrome
Terson syndrome
Testicular dysgenesis syndrome
Tetra-amelia syndrome
Tetralogy of Fallot
Teunissen–Cremers syndrome
Thevenard syndrome
Thoracic insufficiency syndrome
Thoracic outlet syndrome
Thorn's Syndrome
Thrombotic thrombocytopenic purpura
Thymoma with immunodeficiency
Tietz syndrome
Tietze syndrome
tight lens syndrome
Timothy syndrome
TNF receptor associated periodic syndrome
Tolosa–Hunt syndrome
Tonic tensor tympani syndrome
Tooth and nail syndrome
TORCH syndrome
Tourette syndrome
Townes–Brocks syndrome
Toxic anterior segment syndrome
Toxic oil syndrome
Toxic shock syndrome
Tracheobronchomegaly
Transurethral resection of the prostate syndrome
Transverse myelitis
Treacher Collins syndrome
Trench foot
Tricho-hepato-enteric syndrome
Trichothiodystrophy
Tricho–dento–osseous syndrome
Tricho–rhino–phalangeal syndrome
Trigeminal trophic syndrome
Triple X syndrome
Triploid syndrome
Trisomy 8
Tropical splenomegaly syndrome
Trotter's syndrome
Truman Syndrome
Tsukuhara syndrome
Tumor lysis syndrome
Tumor necrosis factor receptor associated periodic syndrome
Turner syndrome
Twiddler's syndrome
Twin Anemia-Polycythemia Sequence
Twin-to-twin transfusion syndrome

U
Untilitant Brainstem Syndrome
Uorica Abdominal Wall
Utility brainstem
Ulysses syndrome
Uncombable hair syndrome
Uner Tan syndrome
Upper airway resistance syndrome
Upper motor neuron syndrome
Upshaw–Schulman syndrome
Urban survival syndrome
Urban–Rogers–Meyer syndrome
Urethral syndrome
Urofacial syndrome
Urticarial vasculitis
Usher syndrome
UV-sensitive syndrome

V
VACTERL association
Valentino's syndrome
Van der Woude syndrome
van Gogh syndrome
Van Wyk and Grumbach syndrome
Vanishing bile duct syndrome
Vascular access steal syndrome
Vasoplegic syndrome
Vestibulocerebellar syndrome
Vici syndrome
Villaret’s syndrome
VIP syndrome
VIPoma
Visual looming syndrome
Vitreous touch syndrome
Vogt–Koyanagi–Harada disease
Von Hippel–Lindau disease
Vulvodynia

W
Waardenburg syndrome
WAGR syndrome
Walker–Warburg syndrome
Wallis–Zieff–Goldblatt syndrome
Waltman Walter syndrome
Warkany syndrome 1
Warmblood Fragile Foal Syndrome
Wartenberg's Syndrome
Waterhouse–Friderichsen syndrome
Watson syndrome
Weaver syndrome
Weber's syndrome
Weill–Marchesani syndrome
Weismann-Netter–Stuhl syndrome
Weissenbacher–Zweymüller syndrome
Wellens' syndrome
Wende–Bauckus syndrome
Werner syndrome
Wernicke–Korsakoff syndrome
West syndrome
Westerhof syndrome
Wet lung syndrome in newborn
WHIM syndrome
White dog shaker syndrome
White dot syndromes
White spot syndrome
White-nose syndrome
widower syndrome
Wiedemann-Steiner syndrome
Wiedemann–Rautenstrauch syndrome
Wildervanck syndrome
Williams syndrome
Williams–Campbell syndrome
Wilson's temperature syndrome
Wilson–Mikity syndrome
Wilson–Turner syndrome
Winchester syndrome
Winter-over syndrome
Wiskott–Aldrich syndrome
Wissler's syndrome
Withdrawal syndrome
Withering abalone syndrome
Wobbly hedgehog syndrome
Wolcott–Rallison syndrome
Wolff–Parkinson–White syndrome
Wolfram syndrome
Wolf–Hirschhorn syndrome
Woodhouse–Sakati syndrome
Work-related musculoskeletal disorders
Worster-Drought syndrome
Worth syndrome
Wrinkly skin syndrome

X
X-linked lymphoproliferative disease
Xeroderma pigmentosum
Xia-Gibbs Syndrome
XX male syndrome
XXXY syndrome
XXYY syndrome
XY gonadal dysgenesis
XYY syndrome

Y
Yellow nail syndrome
Yemenite deaf-blind hypopigmentation syndrome
Yentl Syndrome
Yim–Ebbin syndrome
Young's syndrome
Young–Madders syndrome
Young–Simpson syndrome
Yunis–Varon syndrome
Yunnan sudden death syndrome

Z
Zadik–Barak–Levin syndrome
Zamzam–Sheriff–Phillips syndrome
Zechi-Ceide syndrome
Zellweger syndrome
Zieve's syndrome
Zimmermann–Laband syndrome
Zollinger–Ellison syndrome
Zori–Stalker–Williams syndrome
ZTTK syndrome

Medical lists